SV Lohhof is a German association football club from the Lohhof district of Unterschleißheim, Bavaria, north of Munich. The footballers are part of a sports club that includes departments for athletics, badminton, gymnastics, martial arts, swimming, table tennis, tennis, volleyball, as well as fitness and rehabilitation programs.



History
Established sometime in 1930 as Sportverein Lohhof, the football team first came to notice in the early 1990s with an advance to the Bayernliga. After four seasons in tier IV play, SV won its way to the Regionalliga Süd (III) after a second-place finish and successful promotion playoff in 1994. They took part in group play for the national amateur championship, but were quickly eliminated. An unsuccessful Regionalliga campaign followed and the team was sent back down. In 1999, Lohhof took the Bayernliga (IV) championship to return to third division play for the 1999–2000 season.

The club then suffered through disastrous string of reverses; they finished last in the Regionalliga in 1999–2000, 18th of 20 in the Bayernliga in 2000–01, and last in the Landesliga Bayern-Süd (V) in 2001–02. Their slide continued downward through the Bezirksoberliga Oberbayern (VI) and then withdrawing to the Kreisklasse München-3 (IX) in 2003. They won the division title there in 2006 to advance to the Kreisliga Oberbayern, München-1 (VIII) where they finished 12th in 2007–08 and only through a 4–2 win in the final relegation match did the SVL archive to stay in the Kreisliga for another season. The club's result in the league improved after that to the point where it won the Kreisliga in 2013 and earned promotion to the Bezirksliga.

Honours
The club's honours:
 Bayernliga (III-IV)
 Champions: 1999
 Runners-up: 1994
 Landesliga Bayern-Süd (IV)
 Champions: 1990
 Bezirksliga Oberbayern-Nord
 Runners-up: (3) 1985, 1986, 1987
 Kreisliga München 1
 Champions: 2013

Volleyball
Founded in 1975, the club's men's and women's volleyball sides have enjoyed success at the national level. The women's team was German champions in 1982, 1983, and 1984. They also won the German Cup in each of those seasons, and in 1986.

Recent seasons
The recent season-by-season performance of the club:

With the introduction of the Bezirksoberligas in 1988 as the new fifth tier, below the Landesligas, all leagues below dropped one tier. With the introduction of the Regionalligas in 1994 and the 3. Liga in 2008 as the new third tier, below the 2. Bundesliga, all leagues below dropped one tier. With the establishment of the Regionalliga Bayern as the new fourth tier in Bavaria in 2012 the Bayernliga was split into a northern and a southern division, the number of Landesligas expanded from three to five and the Bezirksoberligas abolished. All leagues from the Bezirksligas onwards were elevated one tier.

References

External links
Official team site
Abseits Guide to German Soccer
Das deutsche Fußball-Archiv historical German domestic league tables 

Football clubs in Germany
Football clubs in Bavaria
Association football clubs established in 1930
Football in Upper Bavaria
1930 establishments in Germany